Volleyball at the 2011 All-Africa Games was held from September 6–16, 2011 at several venues.

Events

Medal table

Medal summary

Medal table

References

External links
 Men's Results
 Women's Results

 
Volleyball at the African Games
A
2011 All-Africa Games